Gerry McEntee (born 19 October 1955) is an Irish former Gaelic footballer who played for the Meath county team. He played club football for Nobber GFC.

Career
During his playing career he helped his club Nobber to rise from Junior "B" to the top level, the Meath Senior Football Championship. He experienced success while playing inter-county football during the 1980s and early 1990s on the Meath teams managed by Seán Boylan, for whom he usually played at midfield. He won two All-Ireland Senior Football Championships in 1987 and 1988, as well as five Leinster Senior Football Championships, two National Football Leagues and a Centenary Cup Medal. He also captained UCD to a Sigerson Cup title in 1978.

McEntee was sent off in the 1988 All-Ireland Senior Football Championship Final replay. He struck Niall Cahalane and was dismissed in the seventh minute of the game.

McEntee managed Dublin club St Brigid's to their first and second Dublin Senior Football Championship in 2003 and again in 2011, as well as their first Leinster Senior Club Football Championship in 2003. He also managed St Brigid's's minor football team to the Minor and Leinster "A" titles in 2007, with the team narrowly missing out on winning the 2008 "A" title after losing the final to Na Fianna by one point after a replay. He also managed the 2008 Dublin minor football team.

McEntee is a qualified surgeon by profession, practising as the hepatobiliary and pancreatic consultant in Dublin's Mater Hospital, and being a former sportsman, also has an interest in groin injuries sustained while playing sport. A member of both the International Hepatobiliary and Pancreatic Association and the Association of Surgeons of Great Britain and Ireland, he operates from Clinic 5 of the hospital's Whitty Building, and from Suite 10 on 69 Eccles Street (the latter for private patients).

McEntee is the brother of Shane McEntee, the deceased Fine Gael TD for Meath. His niece, Helen, is the current minister for justice in the Irish government.

References

1955 births
Living people
Alumni of University College Dublin
Irish sports physicians
Irish surgeons
Gerry
Meath inter-county Gaelic footballers
Nobber Gaelic footballers
UCD Gaelic footballers
Winners of two All-Ireland medals (Gaelic football)